André Rafael Tavares Fonseca,  known as Rafa (born 11 March 1992) is a Portuguese footballer who plays for Louletano DC as a forward.

Club career
He made his professional debut in the Segunda Liga for UD Oliveirense on 22 January 2012 in a game against Freamunde.

References

External links

1992 births
People from Oliveira de Azeméis
Living people
Portuguese footballers
Association football forwards
U.D. Oliveirense players
A.D. Sanjoanense players
Louletano D.C. players
Campeonato de Portugal (league) players
Liga Portugal 2 players
Sportspeople from Aveiro District